San Marco is a Baroque style, Roman Catholic minor basilica church located on Piazza San Marco, in the town of Boretto in the province of Reggio Emilia, Emilia-Romagna, Italy.

History
The present church was built 1871 and 1883, designed by L. Panizzi Moriglo, and granted the status of a Basilica in 1956. The cupola collapsed unexpectedly in 1988, and reconstructed again using modern methods by the architects Roberto Alessi and Antonio Raffagli.

References

Churches in the province of Reggio Emilia
19th-century Roman Catholic church buildings in Italy
Roman Catholic churches completed in 1883
Basilica churches in Emilia-Romagna